"The Guitar (The Lion Sleeps Tonight)" is a song and single by alternative rock band They Might Be Giants, released in 1992.  The track is one of three singles from Apollo 18. The song has also appeared on several compilation albums, including Dial-A-Song: 20 Years Of They Might Be Giants and A User's Guide to They Might Be Giants.

Background
The song, originally titled "The Guitar", was the result of a jam session based around "The Lion Sleeps Tonight" by The Tokens. This motif is most pronounced in the chorus of the song, which is sung by Laura Cantrell, who also appears in the song's music video. However, the influence of "The Lion Sleeps Tonight" is present throughout the song in its continuous bassline. Due to the legal ramifications of the recurring theme, Elektra appended "The Lion Sleeps Tonight" to the end of the song's title.

The music video for "The Guitar" was the first They Might Be Giants video to be directed by bandmember John Flansburgh.

Usage
In promotion of Apollo 18, TMBG performed "The Guitar" and "The Statue Got Me High"  on The Tonight Show with Jay Leno in 1992. For this appearance, the duo of Linnell and Flansburgh debuted their new live backing band, which accompanied them on the Don't Tread on the Cut-Up Snake World Tour in support of Apollo 18. The band also performed the song as part of their 2001 documentary, Gigantic (A Tale of Two Johns).

"The Guitar" was used in a 2013 advertisement for the Buick Encore.

Track listing
 "The Guitar" (Williamsburgh Mix) - 4:13
 "The Guitar" (Outer Planet Mix) - 6:39
 "Welcome to the Jungle" - 2:28
 "I Blame You" - 1:52
 "Moving to the Sun" - 2:17
 "The Guitar" (Even Further Outer Planet Mix) - 6:38

References

External links
The Guitar (The Lion Sleeps Tonight) EP at This Might Be A Wiki
"The Guitar" (song) at This Might Be A Wiki

They Might Be Giants songs
Elektra Records singles
Rough Trade Records singles
Songs written by John Linnell
Songs written by John Flansburgh